Together is an album by saxophonist Eric Kloss which features pianist Barry Miles and was recorded in 1976 and released on the Muse label.

Reception

AllMusic awarded the album 2½ stars.

Track listing 
All compositions by Eric Kloss, except as indicated.
 "Relay" (Barry Miles) - 6:58
 "The Wise Woman" - 6:24
 "Together" (Kloss, Miles) - 6:09
 "Song for a Mountain" (Miles) - 4:19
 "The Goddess, the Gypsy & the Light" - 13:05
 "Opus De Mulier" - 1:55

Personnel 
Eric Kloss - alto saxophone, tenor saxophone
Barry Miles - piano, electric piano, synthesizer

References 

1977 albums
Eric Kloss albums
Barry Miles (musician) albums
Muse Records albums